Prince of Peace Lutheran College is a co-educational Christian College for students in Kindergarten to Year 12 based on two closely located campuses in Everton Hills, North Brisbane.
The Junior Campus on Rogers Parade West, is the home to 500 students in Kindy to Year 6. The Kindergarten and Outside Hours School Care facilities are also based on the Junior Campus and run on behalf of the College by Queensland Lutheran Early Childhood Services.

There are 4 houses called Fraser (after Dawn Fraser), Jackson after (Marjorie Jackson), Laver after (Rod Laver), and Bradman (after Donald Bradman).

Notable alumni
 Tayla Harris - Brisbane Lions Player
 Taymon Kenton-Smith - Paralympian Archery
 Samuel Short - Australian Swimmer

1984 establishments in Australia
Educational institutions established in 1984
Private secondary schools in Brisbane
Lutheran schools in Australia
Private primary schools in Brisbane
High schools and secondary schools affiliated with the Lutheran Church
Elementary and primary schools affiliated with the Lutheran Church